Glazov (Glaz) is a town in the Udmurt Republic, Russia, located along the Trans-Siberian Railway, on the Cheptsa River. Population:

History
It was first mentioned in the 17th century chronicles as a village; town status was granted to it in 1780. During the Russian Civil War, the town was of considerable military importance. It was taken by Kolchak's general Anatoly Pepelyayev on June 2, 1919.

Administrative and municipal status
Within the framework of administrative divisions, Glazov serves as the administrative center of Glazovsky District, even though it is not a part of it. As an administrative division, it is incorporated separately as the town of republic significance of Glazov—an administrative unit with the status equal to that of the districts. As a municipal division, the town of republic significance of Glazov is incorporated as Glazov Urban Okrug.

Economy
The town is known for Chepetsk Mechanical Works, Russian main producer of uranium, zirconium, and calcium metals for nuclear power plants, military, and space technologies. Apart from machine-building, there are wood-working, clothing, and food industries.

Education
There are five establishments of higher education in the town, notably Glazov State Pedagogical Institute named after Vladimir Korolenko and the Glazov branch of Izhevsk State Technical University.

Notable people
Olga Knipper, actress, wife of Anton Chekhov
Vyacheslav Nagovitsyn, politician
Tatyana Baramzina, Hero of the Soviet Union
Elizaveta Tuktamysheva, figure skater

References

Notes

Sources

External links

Official website of Glazov 
Glazov Business Directory jsprav.ru 
Unofficial website of Glazov 

Cities and towns in Udmurtia
Glazovsky Uyezd